Knob Lick may refer to:
Knob Lick, Casey County, Kentucky, a ghost town in Casey County, Kentucky
Knob Lick, Estill County, Kentucky, an unincorporated community in Estill County, Kentucky
Knob Lick, Metcalfe County, Kentucky, an unincorporated community in Metcalfe County, Kentucky
Knob Lick, Missouri, an unincorporated community in Saint Francois County, Missouri